Fast Grants is an American charity that provides funding for scientific research. The project was created in response to the COVID-19 pandemic to provide quick funding to scientists working on research projects that could help with the pandemic.

History 
The project was launched in April 2020 by Tyler Cowen, an economics professor at George Mason University; Patrick Collison, co-founder of online payment processing platform Stripe; and Patrick Hsu, a bioengineer at the University of California.

Support 
The project is supported by donations from Arnold Ventures, The Audacious Project, The Chan Zuckerberg Initiative, John Collison, Patrick Collison, Crankstart, Jack Dorsey, Kim and Scott Farquhar, Paul Graham, Reid Hoffman, Fiona McKean and Tobias Lütke, Yuri and Julia Milner, Elon Musk, Chris and Crystal Sacca, Schmidt Futures, and others.

Grants 
Fast Grants provides funding between $10,000 and $500,000. The charity says they respond to applications within two days, and will also fund researchers outside the United States.

As of April 2021, Fast Grants has awarded 250 grants totaling more than $50 million to researchers working on COVID-19 related projects, including testing, clinical work, surveillance, virology, drug development and trials, and PPE. Fast Grants provided initial funding for SalivaDirect, the saliva test used in the NBA “bubble” in Orlando during the 2020 season.

As of January 2022, new Fast Grants applications have been paused due to lack of additional funding.

References 

Charities based in the United States
Organizations established for the COVID-19 pandemic
Charitable activities related to the COVID-19 pandemic